A listing of the Pulitzer Prize award winners for 2002:

Journalism
 Public Service:
The New York Times, for A Nation Challenged, a special section published regularly after the September 11th terrorist attacks on America, which coherently and comprehensively covered the tragic events, profiled the victims, and tracked the developing story, locally and globally.
 Beat Reporting:
 Gretchen Morgenson of The New York Times, for her trenchant and incisive Wall Street coverage.
 Breaking News Photography
The staff of The New York Times, for its consistently outstanding photographic coverage of the terrorist attack on New York City and its aftermath.
 Breaking News Reporting
The staff of The Wall Street Journal, for its comprehensive and insightful coverage, executed under the most difficult circumstances, of the terrorist attacks on New York City, which recounted the day's events and their implications for the future.
 Commentary
Thomas Friedman of The New York Times, for his clarity of vision, based on extensive reporting, in commenting on the worldwide impact of the terrorist threat.
 Criticism
Justin Davidson of Newsday, Long Island, New York, for his crisp coverage of classical music that captures its essence.
 Editorial Cartooning
Clay Bennett of The Christian Science Monitor
 Editorial Writing
Alex Raksin and Bob Sipchen of the Los Angeles Times, for their comprehensive and powerfully written editorials exploring the issues and dilemmas provoked by mentally ill people dwelling on the streets.
 Explanatory Reporting
The staff of The New York Times, for its informed and detailed reporting, before and after the September 11th attacks on America, that profiled the global terrorism network and the threats it posed.
 Feature Photography
The staff of The New York Times for its photographs chronicling the pain and the perseverance of people enduring protracted conflict in Afghanistan and Pakistan.
 Feature Writing
Barry Siegel of the Los Angeles Times, for his humane and haunting portrait of a man tried for negligence in the death of his son, and the judge who heard the case.
 International Reporting
Barry Bearak of The New York Times, for his deeply affecting and illuminating coverage of daily life in war-torn Afghanistan.
 Investigative Reporting
Sari Horwitz, Scott Higham, and Sarah Cohen of The Washington Post, for a series that exposed the District of Columbia's role in the neglect and death of 229 children placed in protective care between 1993 and 2000, which prompted an overhaul of the city's child welfare system.
 National Reporting
The staff of The Washington Post, for its comprehensive coverage of America's war on terrorism, which regularly brought forth new information together with skilled analysis of unfolding developments.

Letters
 Fiction
Empire Falls by Richard Russo (Alfred A. Knopf)
 History
 The Metaphysical Club: A Story of Ideas in America by Louis Menand (Farrar)
 Biography or Autobiography
John Adams by David McCullough (Simon & Schuster)
 General Non-Fiction
Carry Me Home: Birmingham, Alabama, the Climactic Battle of the Civil Rights Revolution by Diane McWhorter (Simon & Schuster)
 Poetry
Practical Gods by Carl Dennis (Penguin Books)
 Drama
Topdog/Underdog by Suzan-Lori Parks (TCG)
 Music
Ice Field by Henry Brant (Carl Fischer Music). Premiered by the San Francisco Symphony on December 12, 2001, at Davies Symphony Hall, San Francisco, California.

References

External links
 

Pulitzer Prizes by year
Pulitzer Prize
Pulitzer Prize
Pulitzer Prize